Kosciusko is a mostly non-residential neighborhood located in St. Louis, Missouri. It begins at the Mississippi River front in the east and goes up to 7th Boulevard and 8th Street in the west. Interstate 55 is a northern border, and St. George and Dorcas Streets border the south of this neighborhood. Kosciusko is named in honor of Tadeusz Kościuszko, an American Revolutionary war general of Polish descent.

Within its limits are several industrial companies, including the Nooter Corporation. With a population of 52 in 2020, Kosciusko's racial makeup was 38.5% White, 30.8% Black, 0% Asian, 0% American Indian, 1.9% Pacific Islander, 26.9% Two or more races with 15.4% being of Hispanic origin.

The longest continuous graffiti wall, the 1.9 Mile Mississippi River Floodwall, is in this neighborhood. It is home to the annual Labor Day event, Paint Louis.

Schooling

The first independent charter middle school in the city is located in the neighborhood, as well.  Lift for Life Academy, which opened in 2000, offers education for Grades K – 12.

Lyon Park

The City of Saint Louis maintains one city park within the Kosciusko boundaries:  Lyon Park, named after Union Civil War General Nathaniel Lyon.  It houses two softball fields, an asphalt walking trail, and both a monument to General Lyon (sculpted by Adolphus Druiding) and a statue of his likeness created by artist Charles Steubenraugh.  Lyon Park is bounded by South Broadway, South Second Street, Utah Street, and Arsenal Street.

Demographics

References

Kosciusko of Lithuanian Heritage
http://www.draugas.org/news/kosciusko-soldier-humanitarian-lithuanian/

External links
 Kosciusko neighborhood website

Neighborhoods in St. Louis